Sneha Kishore (born 31 December 1993) is an Indian cricketer who plays for Andhra Pradesh. He made his first-class debut on 23 November 2015 in the 2015–16 Ranji Trophy.

References

External links
 

1993 births
Living people
Indian cricketers
Andhra cricketers
People from East Godavari district
Cricketers from Andhra Pradesh